Ara Barton, sometimes listed as Asa Barton (April 12, 1824 – November 6, 1898) was an American politician from the state of Minnesota.

Biography
Ara Barton was born in Charlestown, New Hampshire in 1824, a small town near the border with Vermont. His father was Frye Barton (1790–1871) and his mother was Judith Powers (1790–1888).

Barton moved to Minnesota in 1857 and was elected to the Minnesota House of Representatives in 1859, however the elections in District 3 were contested due to charges of illegal votes, and their opponents were sworn in. He was later elected to the House in 1870. Barton ran for Governor of Minnesota in the 1873 election, losing to Republican Cushman Kellogg Davis and finishing with about 48% of the vote.

In 1876, Barton was sheriff of Rice County, Minnesota, during the failed attempt of the James–Younger Gang to rob a bank in Northfield. On July 19, 1879, he was nominated by the Greenback Party as their candidate for Governor, but declined the nomination five days later. However, in 1889, Barton wrote to Governor William R. Merriam in an attempt to pardon the Younger brothers.

He died in Morristown, Minnesota on November 6, 1898, at the age of 74.

Personal life
Barton married Louisa J. Fish (1823–1890). They had four children: Marcus Dehart Barton, Inez Barton, Phineas W. Barton, and Ara P. Barton.

References

1824 births
1898 deaths
People from Charlestown, New Hampshire
People from Faribault, Minnesota
Democratic Party members of the Minnesota House of Representatives
Minnesota sheriffs
19th-century American politicians